Kamenevo is a rural locality in Kamyshinsky Selsoviet Rural Settlement, Kursky District, Kursk Oblast, Russia. Population:

Geography 
The village is located on the Vinogrobl River (a left tributary of the Tuskar in the basin of the Seym), 102 km from the Russia–Ukraine border, 5 km north-east of the district center – the town Kursk, at the north-western border of the selsoviet center – Kamyshi.

 Streets
There is Severnaya Street (200 houses).

 Climate
Kamenevo has a warm-summer humid continental climate (Dfb in the Köppen climate classification).

Transport 
Kamenevo is located 9 km from the federal route  Crimea Highway (a part of the European route ), on the road of regional importance  (Kursk – Ponyri), on the road of intermunicipal significance  (38K-018 – Kamenevo), 2 km from the railway junction 530 km (railway line Oryol – Kursk).

The rural locality is situated 7 km from Kursk Vostochny Airport, 131 km from Belgorod International Airport and 205 km from Voronezh Peter the Great Airport.

References

Notes

Sources

Rural localities in Kursky District, Kursk Oblast